Chris Lord-Alge is an American mix engineer. He is the brother of both Tom Lord-Alge and Jeff Lord-Alge, both of whom are also audio engineers. Chris and Tom are known for their abundant use of dynamic compression for molding mixes that play well on small speakers and FM radio. Lord-Alge frequently collaborates with Howard Benson, who has produced the plurality of his mix discography.

Career 
Lord-Alge worked at Unique Recording Studios in New York City in the 1980s. While there, he earned for recognition for mixing James Brown's Gravity album (which included the hit song "Living in America"), the Rocky IV soundtrack, Prince's Batman soundtrack, Joe Cocker's Unchain My Heart album, Chaka Khan's Destiny album, Carly Simon's Coming Around Again album, Tina Turner's Foreign Affair album and 12" remixes of Madonna's "La Isla Bonita", the Rolling Stones' "Too Much Blood", and Bruce Springsteen's "Dancing in the Dark", "Cover Me", and "Born in the U.S.A.". In 1989-1990, brothers Chris and Jeff Lord-Alge collaborated on the Oingo Boingo album Dark at the End of the Tunnel, with Jeff Lord-Alge and Bill Jackson recording and Chris Lord-Alge mixing.

Lord-Alge continued to mix for Turner throughout the 90's. During this time he also provided mixing services for Neil Diamond's Tennessee Moon. In 1997, he mixed Green Day's Nimrod, marking the beginning of a continued relationship with the band, mixing the Grammy-winning albums American Idiot (2004) and 21st Century Breakdown (2009).

The 2000's saw Lord-Alge lending his touch prolifically for other pop punk bands, mixing for Billy Talent, Simple Plan, and My Chemical Romance. In the 2010's, Lord-Alge mixed on Celine Dion's Loved Me Back to Life, her first album after a seven year hiatus, as well as Muse's The 2nd Law, a foray into more electronic textures.

Partnership with Waves Audio 
In early 2010, Waves Audio released the "CLA Artist Signature Collection", a collection of six application-specific audio plug-ins for vocals, drums, bass, guitar and the last two of them called "unplugged" (designed for acoustic elements) and "effects" (a collection of six different effects). Waves had previously released a bundle of CLA-branded compressors, featuring the CLA-76 (UREI 1176LN), CLA-2A (Teletronix LA-2A) and CLA-3A (UREI LA-3A). These are among Chris' favorite dynamics units.

List of Grammy Awards

References

External links 
 Chris Lord-Alge - Official Website (chrislordalge.com)
 Video interview
 Artist Direct entry
 "An Evening With Chris Lord-Alge", EQ Magazine, Sep 2006
 Chris Lord-Alge Feature, RecordProduction.com
 Chris Lord-Alge's Waves Plugin Collection

Living people
Grammy Award winners
American audio engineers
1963 births